Maria Plattner (born 6 May 2001) is an Austrian footballer who plays as a midfielder for German Frauen-Bundesliga club 1. FFC Turbine Potsdam and for the Austria women's national team.

International goals

References

External links
Maria Plattner at oefb.at
Maria Plattner at dfb.de

2001 births
Living people
Footballers from Vienna
Austrian women's footballers
Women's association football midfielders
Women's association football forwards
Austria women's international footballers
German women's footballers
2. Frauen-Bundesliga players
Frauen-Bundesliga players
1. FFC Turbine Potsdam players